Madres. Amor y vida is a Spanish medical drama television series created by Aitor Gabilondo and Joan Barbero. Produced by Mediaset España in collaboration with Alea Media, it premiered in 2020 on Amazon Prime Video.

Premise 
The fiction follows a group of women with something of common: their children are hospitalized.

Cast 

Introduced in season 2

Introduced in season 3

Introduced in season 4

Production and release 
Created by Aitor Gabilondo and Joan Barbero, Madres. Amor y vida is produced by Mediaset España in collaboration with Alea Media. Mediterráneo Mediaset España is the series' distributor. The 26 episodes corresponding to the first and second season were shot in Madrid. Consisting of 13 episodes, the first season premiered on Amazon Prime Video on 8 May 2020.

The first season of the series premiered on 9 September 2020 on Telecinco. The second season was released on Amazon Prime Video on 13 November 2020. Despite the bad viewership ratings of the first season's free-to-air broadcasting run on Telecinco (which forced the channel to bring forward the finale in order to make room for new programming leaving 5 unaired episodes), Mediaset España renovated the series for a third season, also ordering the creators to work in a potential fourth season, conceived as a sort of spin-off.

Featuring 8 episodes, season 3 premiered on Amazon Prime Video on 23 September 2021.

NBCUniversal Telemundo Enterprises and Mediterráneo Mediaset España Group struck a distribution agreement so the series could stream on the Peacock's SVOD tier starting in late 2022.

Season 4 premiered on 8 April 2022.

Awards and nominations 

|-
| align = "center" | 2021 || 8th  || Best Drama Actress || Belén Rueda ||  || 
|-
| align = "center" | 2022 || 30th Actors and Actresses Union Awards || Best Television Actress in a Secondary Role || Ana Labordeta ||  || 
|}

References 

Spanish-language Amazon Prime Video original programming
2020s Spanish drama television series
2020 Spanish television series debuts
Spanish-language television shows
2020s medical television series
Spanish medical television series
Television shows filmed in Spain